Orthoceratium is a genus of flies in the family Dolichopodidae. Only two species are included in the genus, Orthoceratium lacustre and Orthoceratium sabulosum. They are known from the West Palaearctic and Tanzania.

In 2018, researchers Marc Pollet and Andreas Stark found that the species O. sabulosum in northwestern Europe had been misidentified as O. lacustre for over 250 years. This was explained by them as a result of previous authors copying identification keys with misleading information, the omission by those authors to study the type specimens of O. sabulosum, and the loss of those of O. lacustre.

Species
The following two species are included in the genus:
 Orthoceratium lacustre (Scopoli, 1763)
 Orthoceratium sabulosum (Becker, 1907)

References

Hydrophorinae
Dolichopodidae genera
Taxa named by Franz von Paula Schrank
Diptera of Europe
Diptera of Africa
Diptera of Asia